Vladimir Nikitović (born 4 December 1980) is a Serbian former football defender.

He has played for FK Drugar Donja Trepča, FK Remont Čačak (2001–2003), FK Takovo (2003–2004), FK Metalac Gornji Milanovac (2004–2006), FK Sloboda Čačak (2006), FK Radnički Kragujevac (2006–2008) and FK Sarajevo (2008–09, 15 league matches, 0 goals), FK Kom (2009–10), FK Škendija (2010–2012) and FK Metalurg Skopje (2012-) in the Macedonian First League .

External sources

 Stats from Serbia at Srbijafudbal.
 Stats from Macedonia at MacedonianFootball.
 Stats at fieldoo.com.
 
 Stats at utakmica.rs

Living people
1980 births
Sportspeople from Čačak
Serbian footballers
Association football defenders
FK Metalac Gornji Milanovac players
FK Radnički 1923 players
FK Sarajevo players
Expatriate footballers in Bosnia and Herzegovina
KF Shkëndija players
Expatriate footballers in North Macedonia
Serbian SuperLiga players
FK Kom players
FK Bregalnica Štip players
FK Donji Srem players
FK Metalurg Skopje players